Sycyssa is a genus of calcareous sponges belonging to the family Lelapiidae. It is monotypic, containing a single species, Sycyssa huxley.

References

Leucosolenida
Taxa named by Ernst Haeckel